Notomanes is a genus of tachinid flies in the family Tachinidae.

Species
Notomanes basalis (Walker, 1836)

Distribution
Chile.

References

Diptera of South America
Endemic fauna of Chile
Monotypic Brachycera genera
Exoristinae
Tachinidae genera
Taxa named by John Merton Aldrich